Immunity-related GTPase family M protein (IRGM), also known as interferon-inducible protein 1 (IFI1), is an enzyme that in humans is encoded by the IRGM gene.

IRGM is a member of the interferon-inducible GTPase family. The encoded protein may play a role in the innate immune response by regulating autophagy formation in response to intracellular pathogens.

The gene has been disabled by an Alu element for at least 25 million years in the primate lineage leading to great apes including humans, but it was re-enabled by an endogenous retrovirus called ERV-9.

Clinical relevance
Polymorphisms that affect the normal expression of this gene are associated with a susceptibility to Crohn's disease and tuberculosis.

References

Further reading 

 
 
 
 
 
 
 
 
 
 
 
 
 
 
 
 
 

EC 3.6.5